Defence Counsel Sedov is a 1988 Soviet drama film directed by Evgeniy Tsymbal.

Plot 
The film takes place in 1937. The film tells about a Moscow lawyer who goes to the provinces to prevent crime.

Cast 
 Vladimir Ilyin
 Albina Matveyeva	
 Tamara Chernova
 Tatyana Rogozina
 Vatslav Dvorzhetsky
 Vsevolod Larionov		
 Garik Sukachyov
 Natalya Shchukina	
 Aleksandr Zharkov
 Igor Nikolayev

References

External links 
 

1988 films
1980s Russian-language films
Soviet drama films
1988 drama films